VLM Airlines was a Belgian airline offering scheduled, charter and ACMI services. It was headquartered at Antwerp International Airport in Deurne. It ceased operations on 31 August 2018. It is not to be confused with its Belgian sister airline VLM Airlines Brussels, which operated leisure charters and ceased operations in December 2018. A new airline known as Air Antwerp which was owned by CityJet (75%) and KLM (25%) launched operations on 9 September 2019 and consisted of ex-employees and fleet of VLM Airlines until its closure in 2021.

History

Early years

VLM Airlines started operations in May 1993 with a scheduled service between Antwerp International Airport and London City Airport. "VLM" is an abbreviation of Vlaamse Luchttransport Maatschappij, "Flemish Air Transport Company". Its original hub was Antwerp; this was switched to London City, and after a management buy-out late in 2014, it was again based at Antwerp Airport.

On 24 December 2007, Air France-KLM agreed to buy the company from Panta Holdings. In 2008 the airline reported its tenth consecutive year of profits; for the year ending 31 December 2007 it had a net profit of 3.6m euros. Turnover grew to 112m euros and passenger numbers rose 9% to 745,781 during 2007. The airline at this point employed over 400 people, and carried 745,781 passengers in 2007.

Air France-KLM announced on 28 May 2009 that VLM Airlines would gradually start to operate under the brand name CityJet. The name CityJet was already in use by the Irish regional partner of Air France-KLM. In 2010 the name VLM Airlines had been replaced altogether by CityJet. This merger was never completed. On 16 February 2010 CityJet launched a new seating configuration on their aircraft, including the Fokker 50 aircraft added during the merger. They were fitted with CityPlus, a 4-abreast premium economy class along with CityValue, the standard economy.

VLM used to promote itself as Europe's leading "business airline" and tried to reflect this in its pursuit of superior service. Passengers were served fresh meals on board, and were able to request a vegetarian or kosher meal at the time of reservation. Meals were presented on a half-tray, and all passengers were served drinks in real glasses with tea and coffee served in china cups. Such features are not commonly found on short-haul airlines. After the CityJet/Air France takeover, this product was downgraded to reflect the Air France-KLM product on short-haul flights—a simpler service of sandwiches and drinks, with glassware and china cups replaced by plastic. However, the airline did continue to distribute boiled sweets to its passengers before take-off, and Belgian chocolates mid-flight.

Development since the 2010s

In early 2014, following the sale of CityJet by Air France to German investor Intro Aviation, the latter decided to "demerge" Cityjet and VLM. VLM would from then on provide aircraft and crews on an ACMI basis.

In October 2014, however, the management of VLM Airlines undertook a management buyout and VLM became independent from CityJet and Intro Aviation. The CEO, Arthur White, became the majority shareholder. The company continued to provide services to Cityjet and to offer charter services and reintroduced scheduled flights from Antwerp Airport to Geneva and other destinations. In the same month the airline signed a contract to lease two Sukhoi Superjet 100s, with options for 12 more, as a possible replacement for the Fokker 50s, to be delivered from April 2015. This date was later revised to 2016 due to certification delays, however the order was cancelled.

In March 2015, it was announced that VLM would take over two routes from Waterford Airport, Ireland to the UK which were previously served by Stobart Air and Flybe. The routes to London Luton and Birmingham started late April 2015 and continues throughout 2016. In June 2015, VLM announced it would discontinue all operations to and from their new base at Liège Airport (to Avignon, Nice and Venice) after only six weeks of service, due to low demand. In December 2015, VLM Airlines announced it would base three aircraft at Friedrichshafen Airport in Germany by February 2016 to take over the domestic routes to Berlin, Düsseldorf and Hamburg previously provided by bankrupt regional carrier InterSky.

Demise

On 13 May 2016, VLM Airlines filed for bankruptcy protection at a court in Antwerp after accumulating €6 million of debt. Bankruptcy protection was granted for a duration of six months on 25 May 2016. VLM planned to continue its operations with a turn around plan that envisaged a return to break even in mid 2017 with the main focus on improving cash flow, stabilising the economic situation and stabilising operations. After the bankruptcy protection was announced, several pilots left the airline due to a restructuring plan which focused on cost reduction and maximizing revenue.

VLM Airlines announced the termination of its flights from its Waterford Airport base to London-Luton at short notice by 13 June 2016, leaving Waterford without any scheduled traffic.

On 22 June 2016, People's Viennaline announced the cancellation of its ACMI contract with VLM without further notice, citing a lack of quality in the provided services, e.g. several delays and cancellations. Later on the same day, VLM Airlines declared bankruptcy. All flights were cancelled with immediate effect and all planes grounded. The airline's website was shut down a few hours later.

Owing to VLM's demise, its ACMI customer CityJet replaced VLM with Danish Air Transport on the London City Airport to Antwerp route.

New ownership, restart of operations and second demise
On 9 September 2016, SHS Antwerp Aviation reached an agreement with receivers. SHS Antwerp Aviation is owned by the Dutch SHS Aviation b.v. From November 2016, it employs 15 people. To start operations, a new AOC will need to be asked. The new fleet currently has seven Fokker 50's registered to SHS Antwerp Aviation.

VLM restarted the London City Airport to Antwerp route on 30 October 2017, taking over the route previously operated by Danish Air Transport.

In March 2017 SHS Aviation announced it would take over the flight licences, two of the remaining Thomas Cook Airlines Belgium aircraft, and the remaining 40 employees, and integrate them into the reestablished VLM Airlines. The 'new' airline's first flight was TCW7011 from Brussels to Eskisehir Airport and returning to Brussels as TCW7012 on 11 November 2017. The two Airbus A320 aircraft (OO-TCT and OO-TCX) have been re-registered to VLM Airlines.

In February 2018, a Dutch investor, SF Aviation Management B.V., took over the former Thomas Cook Airlines Belgium activities and aircraft that were renamed VLM Airlines (Brussels). The Antwerp activities would continue as VLM Regional. One of the A320 aircraft was returned to Thomas Cook. The remaining A320 (OO-TCT) is used for charter and ACMI activities. On 17 June 2018, CEO Harm Jan Prins announced an A321 would soon join the fleet.

On 24 April 2018, VLM announced routes from Manchester to Antwerp and Ostend-Bruges to be launched on 1 October 2018. However, these plans were cancelled shortly after.

On 6 August 2018, VLM Airlines announced the termination of all scheduled routes except two (the remaining destinations being London and Zurich) at Antwerp International Airport in the coming weeks to focus on charter operations. In the same time, VLM announced the retirement of their Fokker 50 fleet while a new aircraft was to be acquired for charter operations.

On 31 August 2018 however, VLM ceased all operations again following a decision by its shareholders to go into liquidation.

Destinations 
As of 21 August 2018, shortly before its demise, VLM Airlines operated to the following scheduled destinations:

Belgium
Antwerp – Antwerp International Airport base

Germany
Cologne – Cologne Bonn Airport (was to be terminated on 16 September 2018)
Munich – Munich Airport (was to be terminated on 14 September 2018)
Rostock – Rostock–Laage Airport (was to be terminated on 16 September 2018)

Switzerland
Zürich – Zürich Airport

United Kingdom
Aberdeen – Aberdeen Airport (was to be terminated on 14 September 2018)
London – London City Airport

Former destinations 
Ireland
Waterford – Waterford Airport

Slovenia
Maribor – Maribor Edvard Rusjan Airport base

United Kingdom
Birmingham – Birmingham Airport
London – Luton Airport

Germany
Mönchengladbach – Mönchengladbach Airport

Luxembourg
Luxembourg – Luxembourg Airport

Fleet 
As of August 2018, the VLM Airlines fleet included the following aircraft. Not included are the fleets of VLM Airlines Slovenia, which operated further Fokker 50s, and VLM Airlines Brussels, which operated Airbus A320 family aircraft.

References

External links 

 

Defunct airlines of Belgium
Airlines established in 1993
Airlines disestablished in 2018
1993 establishments in Belgium
2018 disestablishments in Belgium
Companies based in Antwerp